The 2014 European Darts Trophy was the eighth of eight PDC European Tour events on the 2014 PDC Pro Tour. The tournament took place at the Kohlrabizirkus in Leipzig, Germany, between 19–21 September 2014. It featured a field of 48 players and £100,000 in prize money, with £20,000 going to the winner.

After finishing second in the previous European Tour event, Michael Smith won his first European Tour event by beating Michael van Gerwen 6–5 in the final. This tournament ended the 2014 PDC European Tour, with a different winner in each of the eight events.

Prize money

Qualification and format
The top 16 players from the PDC ProTour Order of Merit on 30 June 2014 automatically qualified for the event. The remaining 32 places went to players from three qualifying events - 20 from the UK Qualifier (held in Coventry on 4 July), eight from the European Qualifier and four from the Host Nation Qualifier (both held at the venue the day before the event started).

Gary Anderson, Phil Taylor, Robert Thornton and Adrian Lewis withdrew from the tournament, therefore the highest-ranked qualifiers - Terry Jenkins, Michael Smith, Andy Hamilton and Wes Newton - become seeded players. To complete the field of 48 players, two additional places in the draw were made available in the European Qualifier and the Home Nation Qualifier. All seeds receive a bye into the second round. 

The following players took part in the tournament:

Top 16
  Michael van Gerwen (runner-up)
  Brendan Dolan (third round)
  Dave Chisnall (second round)
  Peter Wright (quarter-finals)
  Ian White (third round)
  Kim Huybrechts (third round)
  Steve Beaton (second round) 
  Simon Whitlock (quarter-finals)
  Mervyn King (second round)
  Vincent van der Voort (third round)
  Justin Pipe (quarter-finals)
  Jamie Caven (second round)
  Terry Jenkins (third round)
  Michael Smith (winner)
  Andy Hamilton (semi-finals)
  Wes Newton (third round)

UK Qualifier 
  Ronnie Baxter (first round)
  Stephen Bunting (first round)
  Richie Burnett (first round)
  Ricky Evans (first round)
  Andrew Gilding (second round)
  James Hubbard (first round)
  Mickey Mansell (first round)
  Shaun Narain (second round)
  William O'Connor (second round)
  Kevin Painter (second round)
  Gerwyn Price (quarter-finals)
  Andy Smith (second round)
  Ross Smith (second round)
  James Wade (first round)
  Steve West (second round)
  Dean Winstanley (semi-finals)

European Qualifier
  Ronny Huybrechts (second round)
  Mensur Suljović (first round)
  Roxy-James Rodriguez (third round)
  Gino Vos (first round)
  Raymond van Barneveld (second round)
  Christian Kist (first round)
  Jelle Klaasen (third round)
  Ryan de Vreede (second round)
  Dimitri Van den Bergh (first round)
  Dirk van Duijvenbode (first round)

Host Nation Qualifier
  Bernd Roith (first round)
  Max Hopp (first round)
  Michael Hurtz (second round)
  Jyhan Artut (second round)
  Tomas Seyler (first round)
  Michael Rosenauer (first round)

Draw

References

2014 PDC European Tour
2014 in German sport